The Black Country derby is the local derby between English football teams West Bromwich Albion and Wolverhampton Wanderers. Both clubs reside in Staffordshire’s historic boundaries, but they are separated 11 miles (18 km) apart in the Black Country of the present-dayWest Midlands county.

The most successful side in the Black Country derby is West Bromwich Albion, losing just three of the past 23 matches between the two sides. Wolves are currently in the Premier League, and West Brom in the EFL Championship following their relegation in 2021.

History

Early history

The earliest Black Country derbies were contested before the formation of the Football League. The first ever derby took place on 20 January 1883, when Albion won 4–2 in the third round of the Birmingham Senior Cup. Wolves and Albion's first two 'official' meetings came in the FA Cup in 1886 and 1887, with Albion recording victories on both occasions and going on to reach the final in both years. The first of Walsall's fixtures against Wolves and Albion were also in the FA Cup, in 1889 and 1900 respectively.

With both West Bromwich Albion and Wolverhampton Wanderers being founder members of the Football League in 1888, the Black Country derby between these two teams is one of the oldest in the world in league football. The fixture was contested in each of the first 13 league seasons from 1888 to 1901. Attendances in these early fixtures were modest, but that was the case across much of the country as football gradually grew in popularity at the turn of the century. By the 1906–07 season, the fixtures began to regularly attract crowds above 20,000 and a more intense rivalry emerged.

Post-war zenith

The Albion–Wolves derby reached its peak in the 1950s when both sides challenged for honours at the top of English football, with each in the First Division from 1949 to 1965. Wolves enjoyed league and cup domination for a good deal of the 1950s; finishing in the top 3 on nine occasions, winning the title three times and FA Cup twice in this period. Albion were also a strong side, renowned for their attacking flair, and also challenged near the top of the league. They won the FA Cup in 1954.

It was the 1953–54 season in which the sides finished as the top 2 clubs in the country for the first and only time. Wolves won the league title, finishing four points ahead of the Baggies, despite Albion topping the table for the majority of the season. Wolves' league win coupled with Albion's cup win meant they contested the Charity Shield in 1954 – the only time the two teams have met in the final of any competition. The game finished 4–4 in front of a Molineux crowd of 45,035.

Throughout the rest of the century both sides met frequently, with a six-year period in the 1980s the longest gap without a meeting between the two Black Country rivals. Walsall's continued existence in the lower divisions meant they avoided any league meetings with either of their neighbours for decade after decade. However, in the 1980s they met Wolves for one season in 1985–86 and Albion for one season in 1988–89.

When the Premier League was formed in 1992 both Albion and Wolves were outside the top division but they continued to meet in the 'new' First Division throughout the 1990s. The rivalry remained intense and due to police concerns and televised games, the fixture has not been staged at the traditional English kick-off time of 3pm on a Saturday since 1996. Hooliganism in the fixtures was a big problem in the 1960s and the frictions between fanbases causes regular restrictions on local pubs on match days.

Modern meetings

Following Walsall's unlikely promotion to the First Division in 1999, the 1999–2000 season represented the first time all three sides had ever been in the same division. Walsall took the bragging rights with a double over Albion and an away win at Molineux, while Albion and Wolves shared the spoils in both league fixtures. Albion and Walsall were in a battle with each other to avoid relegation and ultimately it was the Saddlers who faced the drop, putting an end to the three-way Black Country derbies after only one season.

A year later Walsall earned an immediate return to the First Division and once again all three sides occupied the same level in the 2001–02 season. This time around it was Albion and Wolves who were in direct competition in the league, with both sides going for promotion. Both fixtures against each other were in the first half of the season, with a 1–1 draw at the Hawthorns and a 1–0 victory for Albion at Molineux. By 6 March 2002, after 38 games of the season, Wolves were ten points ahead of Albion but gained only 9 more points compared to Albion's 22 in the last eight matches and the Baggies clinched automatic promotion in second place on the final day of the season. Wolves were subsequently beaten in the play-offs by Norwich.

The Baggies were relegated from the Premier League after only one season and saw Wolves take their place in the top flight. To rub even more salt into the wounds, a Paul Merson-inspired Walsall side thumped them 4–1 on the opening day of the 2003–04 season. But it was Albion who had the last laugh, as they were promoted once again and Walsall's stint in the second tier came to an end as they dropped into League One.

After a five-year break without a derby between Albion and Wolves the 2006–07 season saw the teams meet a record five times. Albion won the first meeting 3–0 at the Hawthorns before Wolves won the return fixture 1–0 at Molineux. The clubs also met in the FA Cup fourth round, with Albion triumphing 3–0 at Molineux – a major riot followed in the city centre as hundreds of fans clashed. At the end of the season the clubs finished level on points and met in the Championship play-offs. Both legs were won by Albion, sending them through to the final 4–2 on aggregate. However, they lost 1–0 in the final to Derby at Wembley.

In the 2010–11 season the two sides met for the first time in the Premier League, marking the first top flight derby in nearly 27 years. The first league meeting at the Hawthorns ended 1–1 with Jamie O'Hara giving Wolves a first-half lead before an injury time equaliser from Albion's Carlos Vela earned the Baggies a point. In the return fixture at Molineux, Wolves claimed the bragging rights with a 3–1 win. The victory was particularly crucial in helping Wolves escape relegation.

The latest meetings between Albion and Wolves were in the 2011–12 season when both clubs, again, competed in the top flight. Albion claimed a league double over their bitter rivals for the first time since 1997–98. A 2–0 win at the Hawthorns was followed by a 5–1 demolition of Wolves away at Molineux where Peter Odemwingie grabbed a hat-trick. Wolves manager Mick McCarthy was sacked the next day and Wolves were relegated from the Premier League at the end of the season.

Wolves' demise continued and they found themselves relegated again the following season, meeting up with Walsall in League One in 2013–14. The two Black Country rivals met twice in the league and once in the Football League Trophy. The most recent derby being a 3–0 victory for Wolves at Bescot Stadium on 8 March 2014.

The 2020–21 season saw Wolves and Albion- who had won promotion the season before- clash for the first time in 9 years. Their first meeting at the Molineux on 16 January 2021 ended in a 3–2 win for Albion, with two penalties from Matheus Pereira and a goal from Semi Ajayi winning the match for WBA.

As of the 2021-22 season the three clubs are in three different divisions, as Wolves compete in the Premier League, Albion in the EFL Championship and Walsall in the EFL League Two.

List of derbies

Albion–Wolves

Statistics

Managers

Honours

Walsall–Wolves

Statistics

Managers

Honours

Walsall–Albion

Statistics

Managers

Honours

Crossing the divide

Albion–Wolves

Played for all three

References

England football derbies
Football in the West Midlands (county)
Walsall F.C.
West Bromwich Albion F.C.
Wolverhampton Wanderers F.C.
Sport in Wolverhampton
Black Country
1886 establishments in England